Terri Lea Britt (née Utley; born 1961) is an American beauty queen, actress, television personality, author and motivational speaker from Arkansas who was crowned Miss USA in 1982.

Early life
As a young woman, Britt was involved in the American Legion Auxiliary Girls State program. She was also vice-president of the Cabot High School class of 1980.

Miss USA
Britt won her first major pageant title, Miss Arkansas USA, in early 1982. She went on to win the title Miss USA in the nationally televised pageant held in Biloxi, Mississippi in May 1982. She was twenty years old at the time.

Britt went on to represent the United States in the Miss Universe pageant in Lima, Peru in July of the same year. In that pageant, she finished as fourth runner-up to Karen Dianne Baldwin of Canada.

Britt's most recognizable feature was her Bob cut.

Notable firsts
Britt is the first Miss USA titleholder from Arkansas. After she won the title, no women from Arkansas placed in the pageant until Jessica Furrer's semi-finalist placement in 2005. Both women are members of Alpha Sigma Tau.

Britt was also the first Miss Arkansas USA to hail from Cabot, and the only winner until Whitney Moore of the same town won the title in 2000.

Later life
Soon after passing on her title, Britt studied journalism, becoming a writer and field producer for a West Coast news station. She then became a spokeswoman for Mazda. Britt then worked as a news anchor on Movietime television (now known as E!), which gave her the opportunity to cover such events as the Academy Awards and the Cannes Film Festival.

In 1990, Britt briefly appeared in a promo for the science-fiction television show Quantum Leap on NBC where she also plays as a news anchor before Beckett had leaped into her body.

Britt left the entertainment industry to spend time with her husband and family, which included three daughters. Her life was adversely affected by the death of her father, which led her to confront the anger issues which she claims affected her role as a wife and mother. She became involved in traditional healing, and studied energetic healing, meditation, and spiritual consulting in Santa Monica, California. Britt currently works as a spiritual coach and motivational speaker in Cleveland, GA. She is the award-winning author of "The Enlightened Mom," voted Best Spiritual Book of 2011 at both New York and San Francisco Book Festivals.

References

External links
Official Miss USA website
Official Miss Arkansas USA website

1961 births
Living people
Miss Universe 1982 contestants
Miss USA winners
People from Cabot, Arkansas